In astronomy, the geocentric model (also known as geocentrism, often exemplified specifically by the Ptolemaic system) is a superseded description of the Universe with Earth at the center. Under most geocentric models, the Sun, Moon, stars, and planets all orbit Earth. The geocentric model was the predominant description of the cosmos in many European ancient civilizations, such as those of Aristotle in Classical Greece and Ptolemy in Roman Egypt. Ptolemy’s geocentric model was adopted and refined during the Islamic Golden Age, which Muslims believed correlated with the teachings of Islam.

Two observations supported the idea that Earth was the center of the Universe:
 First, from anywhere on Earth, the Sun appears to revolve around Earth once per day. While the Moon and the planets have their own motions, they also appear to revolve around Earth about once per day. The stars appeared to be fixed on a celestial sphere rotating once each day about an axis through the geographic poles of Earth.
 Second, Earth seems to be unmoving from the perspective of an earthbound observer; it feels solid, stable, and stationary.

Ancient Greek, ancient Roman, and medieval philosophers usually combined the geocentric model with a spherical Earth, in contrast to the older flat-Earth model implied in some mythology. The ancient Jewish Babylonian uranography pictured a flat Earth with a dome-shaped, rigid canopy called the firmament placed over it (רקיע- rāqîa'). However, the Greek astronomer and mathematician Aristarchus of Samos (c. 310 – c. 230 BC) developed a heliocentric model placing all of the then-known planets in their correct order around the Sun. The ancient Greeks believed that the motions of the planets were circular, a view that was not challenged in Western culture until the 17th century, when Johannes Kepler postulated that orbits were heliocentric and elliptical (Kepler's first law of planetary motion). In 1687 Newton showed that elliptical orbits could be derived from his laws of gravitation.

The astronomical predictions of Ptolemy's geocentric model, developed in the 2nd century CE, served as the basis for preparing astrological and astronomical charts for over 1,500 years. The geocentric model held sway into the early modern age, but from the late 16th century onward, it was gradually superseded by the heliocentric model of Copernicus (1473–1543), Galileo (1564–1642), and Kepler (1571–1630). There was much resistance to the transition between these two theories. Some felt that a new, unknown theory could not subvert an accepted consensus for geocentrism.

Ancient Greece

The geocentric model entered Greek astronomy and philosophy at an early point; it can be found in pre-Socratic philosophy. In the 6th century BC, Anaximander proposed a cosmology with Earth shaped like a section of a pillar (a cylinder), held aloft at the center of everything. The Sun, Moon, and planets were holes in invisible wheels surrounding Earth; through the holes, humans could see concealed fire. About the same time, Pythagoras thought that the Earth was a sphere (in accordance with observations of eclipses), but not at the center; he believed that it was in motion around an unseen fire. Later these views were combined, so most educated Greeks from the 4th century BC on thought that the Earth was a sphere at the center of the universe.

In the 4th century BC, two influential Greek philosophers, Plato and his student Aristotle, wrote works based on the geocentric model. According to Plato, the Earth was a sphere, stationary at the center of the universe. The stars and planets were carried around the Earth on spheres or circles, arranged in the order (outwards from the center): Moon, Sun, Venus, Mercury, Mars, Jupiter, Saturn, fixed stars, with the fixed stars located on the celestial sphere. In his "Myth of Er", a section of the Republic, Plato describes the cosmos as the Spindle of Necessity, attended by the Sirens and turned by the three Fates. Eudoxus of Cnidus, who worked with Plato, developed a less mythical, more mathematical explanation of the planets' motion based on Plato's dictum stating that all phenomena in the heavens can be explained with uniform circular motion. Aristotle elaborated on Eudoxus' system.

In the fully developed Aristotelian system, the spherical Earth is at the center of the universe, and all other heavenly bodies are attached to 47–55 transparent, rotating spheres surrounding the Earth, all concentric with it. (The number is so high because several spheres are needed for each planet.) These spheres, known as crystalline spheres, all moved at different uniform speeds to create the revolution of bodies around the Earth. They were composed of an incorruptible substance called aether. Aristotle believed that the Moon was in the innermost sphere and therefore touches the realm of Earth, causing the dark spots (macula) and the ability to go through lunar phases. He further described his system by explaining the natural tendencies of the terrestrial elements: Earth, water, fire, air, as well as celestial aether. His system held that Earth was the heaviest element, with the strongest movement towards the center, thus water formed a layer surrounding the sphere of Earth. The tendency of air and fire, on the other hand, was to move upwards, away from the center, with fire being lighter than air. Beyond the layer of fire, were the solid spheres of aether in which the celestial bodies were embedded. They, themselves, were also entirely composed of aether.

Adherence to the geocentric model stemmed largely from several important observations. First of all, if the Earth did move, then one ought to be able to observe the shifting of the fixed stars due to stellar parallax. In short, if the Earth was moving, the shapes of the constellations should change considerably over the course of a year. If they did not appear to move, the stars are either much farther away than the Sun and the planets than previously conceived, making their motion undetectable, or in reality they are not moving at all. Because the stars were actually much further away than Greek astronomers postulated (making movement extremely subtle), stellar parallax was not detected until the 19th century. Therefore, the Greeks chose the simpler of the two explanations. Another observation used in favor of the geocentric model at the time was the apparent consistency of Venus' luminosity, which implies that it is usually about the same distance from Earth, which in turn is more consistent with geocentrism than heliocentrism (in fact, Venus' luminous consistency is due to any loss of light caused by its phases being compensated for by an increase in apparent size caused by its varying distance from Earth). Objectors to heliocentrism noted that terrestrial bodies naturally tend to come to rest as near as possible to the center of the Earth. Further barring the opportunity to fall closer the center, terrestrial bodies tend not to move unless forced by an outside object, or transformed to a different element by heat or moisture.

Atmospheric explanations for many phenomena were preferred because the Eudoxan–Aristotelian model based on perfectly concentric spheres was not intended to explain changes in the brightness of the planets due to a change in distance. Eventually, perfectly concentric spheres were abandoned as it was impossible to develop a sufficiently accurate model under that ideal. However, while providing for similar explanations, the later deferent and epicycle model was flexible enough to accommodate observations for many centuries.

Ptolemaic model

Although the basic tenets of Greek geocentrism were established by the time of Aristotle, the details of his system did not become standard. The Ptolemaic system, developed by the Hellenistic astronomer Claudius Ptolemaeus in the 2nd century AD finally standardised geocentrism. His main astronomical work, the Almagest, was the culmination of centuries of work by Hellenic, Hellenistic and Babylonian astronomers. For over a millennium European and Islamic astronomers assumed it was the correct cosmological model. Because of its influence, people sometimes wrongly think the Ptolemaic system is identical with the geocentric model.

Ptolemy argued that the Earth was a sphere in the center of the universe, from the simple observation that half the stars were above the horizon and half were below the horizon at any time (stars on rotating stellar sphere), and the assumption that the stars were all at some modest distance from the center of the universe. If the Earth were substantially displaced from the center, this division into visible and invisible stars would not be equal.

Ptolemaic system

In the Ptolemaic system, each planet is moved by a system of two spheres: one called its deferent; the other, its epicycle. The deferent is a circle whose center point, called the eccentric and marked in the diagram with an X, is distant from the Earth. The original purpose of the eccentric was to account for the difference in length of the seasons (northern autumn was about five days shorter than spring during this time period) by placing the Earth away from the center of rotation of the rest of the universe. Another sphere, the epicycle, is embedded inside the deferent sphere and is represented by the smaller dotted line to the right. A given planet then moves around the epicycle at the same time the epicycle moves along the path marked by the deferent. These combined movements cause the given planet to move closer to and further away from the Earth at different points in its orbit, and explained the observation that planets slowed down, stopped, and moved backward in retrograde motion, and then again reversed to resume normal, or prograde, motion.

The deferent-and-epicycle model had been used by Greek astronomers for centuries along with the idea of the eccentric (a deferent which center is slightly away from the Earth), which was even older. In the illustration, the center of the deferent is not the Earth but the spot marked X, making it eccentric (from the Greek ἐκ ec- meaning "from," and κέντρον kentron meaning "center"), from which the spot takes its name. Unfortunately, the system that was available in Ptolemy's time did not quite match observations, even though it was improved over Hipparchus' system. Most noticeably the size of a planet's retrograde loop (especially that of Mars) would be smaller, and sometimes larger, than expected, resulting in positional errors of as much as 30 degrees. To alleviate the problem, Ptolemy developed the equant. The equant was a point near the center of a planet's orbit which, if you were to stand there and watch, the center of the planet's epicycle would always appear to move at uniform speed; all other locations would see non-uniform speed, like on the Earth. By using an equant, Ptolemy claimed to keep motion which was uniform and circular, although it departed from the Platonic ideal of uniform circular motion. The resultant system, which eventually came to be widely accepted in the west, seems unwieldy to modern astronomers; each planet required an epicycle revolving on a deferent, offset by an equant which was different for each planet. It predicted various celestial motions, including the beginning and end of retrograde motion, to within a maximum error of 10 degrees, considerably better than without the equant.

The model with epicycles is in fact a very good model of an elliptical orbit with low eccentricity. The well known ellipse shape does not appear to a noticeable extent when the eccentricity is less than 5%, but the offset distance of the "center" (in fact the focus occupied by the sun) is very noticeable even with low eccentricities as possessed by the planets.

To summarize, Ptolemy devised a system that was compatible with Aristotelian philosophy and managed to track actual observations and predict future movement mostly to within the limits of the next 1000 years of observations. The observed motions and his mechanisms for explaining them include:

The geocentric model was eventually replaced by the heliocentric model. Copernican heliocentrism could remove Ptolemy's epicycles because the retrograde motion could be seen to be the result of the combination of Earth and planet movement and speeds. Copernicus felt strongly that equants were a violation of Aristotelian purity, and proved that replacement of the equant with a pair of new epicycles was entirely equivalent. Astronomers often continued using the equants instead of the epicycles because the former was easier to calculate, and gave the same result.

It has been determined, in fact, that the Copernican, Ptolemaic and even the Tychonic models provided identical results to identical inputs. They are computationally equivalent. It wasn't until Kepler demonstrated a physical observation that could show that the physical sun is directly involved in determining an orbit that a new model was required.

The Ptolemaic order of spheres from Earth outward is:
 Moon
 Mercury
 Venus
 Sun
 Mars
 Jupiter
 Saturn
 Fixed Stars
 Primum Mobile ("First Moved")

Ptolemy did not invent or work out this order, which aligns with the ancient Seven Heavens religious cosmology common to the major Eurasian religious traditions. It also follows the decreasing orbital periods of the Moon, Sun, planets and stars.

Persian and Arab astronomy and geocentrism

Muslim astronomers generally accepted the Ptolemaic system and the geocentric model, but by the 10th century texts appeared regularly whose subject matter was doubts concerning Ptolemy (shukūk). Several Muslim scholars questioned the Earth's apparent immobility and centrality within the universe. Some Muslim astronomers believed that the Earth rotates around its axis, such as Abu Sa'id al-Sijzi (d. circa 1020). According to al-Biruni, Sijzi invented an astrolabe called al-zūraqī based on a belief held by some of his contemporaries "that the motion we see is due to the Earth's movement and not to that of the sky." The prevalence of this view is further confirmed by a reference from the 13th century which states: According to the geometers [or engineers] (muhandisīn), the Earth is in constant circular motion, and what appears to be the motion of the heavens is actually due to the motion of the Earth and not the stars. Early in the 11th century Alhazen wrote a scathing critique of Ptolemy's model in his Doubts on Ptolemy (c. 1028), which some have interpreted to imply he was criticizing Ptolemy's geocentrism, but most agree that he was actually criticizing the details of Ptolemy's model rather than his geocentrism.

In the 12th century, Arzachel departed from the ancient Greek idea of uniform circular motions by hypothesizing that the planet Mercury moves in an elliptic orbit, while Alpetragius proposed a planetary model that abandoned the equant, epicycle and eccentric mechanisms, though this resulted in a system that was mathematically less accurate. Alpetragius also declared the Ptolemaic system as an imaginary model that was successful at predicting planetary positions but not real or physical. His alternative system spread through most of Europe during the 13th century.

Fakhr al-Din al-Razi (1149–1209), in dealing with his conception of physics and the physical world in his Matalib, rejects the Aristotelian and Avicennian notion of the Earth's centrality within the universe, but instead argues that there are "a thousand thousand worlds (alfa alfi 'awalim) beyond this world such that each one of those worlds be bigger and more massive than this world as well as having the like of what this world has." To support his theological argument, he cites the Qur'anic verse, "All praise belongs to God, Lord of the Worlds," emphasizing the term "Worlds."

The "Maragha Revolution" refers to the Maragha school's revolution against Ptolemaic astronomy. The "Maragha school" was an astronomical tradition beginning in the Maragha observatory and continuing with astronomers from the Damascus mosque and Samarkand observatory. Like their Andalusian predecessors, the Maragha astronomers attempted to solve the equant problem (the circle around whose circumference a planet or the center of an epicycle was conceived to move uniformly) and produce alternative configurations to the Ptolemaic model without abandoning geocentrism. They were more successful than their Andalusian predecessors in producing non-Ptolemaic configurations which eliminated the equant and eccentrics, were more accurate than the Ptolemaic model in numerically predicting planetary positions, and were in better agreement with empirical observations. The most important of the Maragha astronomers included Mo'ayyeduddin Urdi (d. 1266), Nasīr al-Dīn al-Tūsī (1201–1274), Qutb al-Din al-Shirazi (1236–1311), Ibn al-Shatir (1304–1375), Ali Qushji (c. 1474), Al-Birjandi (d. 1525), and Shams al-Din al-Khafri (d. 1550). Ibn al-Shatir, the Damascene astronomer (1304–1375 AD) working at the Umayyad Mosque, wrote a major book entitled Kitab Nihayat al-Sul fi Tashih al-Usul (A Final Inquiry Concerning the Rectification of Planetary Theory) on a theory which departs largely from the Ptolemaic system known at that time. In his book, Ibn al-Shatir, an Arab astronomer of the fourteenth century, E. S. Kennedy wrote "what is of most interest, however, is that Ibn al-Shatir's lunar theory, except for trivial differences in parameters, is identical with that of Copernicus (1473–1543 AD)." The discovery that the models of Ibn al-Shatir are mathematically identical to those of Copernicus suggests the possible transmission of these models to Europe. At the Maragha and Samarkand observatories, the Earth's rotation was discussed by al-Tusi and Ali Qushji (b. 1403); the arguments and evidence they used resemble those used by Copernicus to support the Earth's motion.

However, the Maragha school never made the paradigm shift to heliocentrism. The influence of the Maragha school on Copernicus remains speculative, since there is no documentary evidence to prove it. The possibility that Copernicus independently developed the Tusi couple remains open, since no researcher has yet demonstrated that he knew about Tusi's work or that of the Maragha school.

Geocentrism and rival systems

Not all Greeks agreed with the geocentric model. The Pythagorean system has already been mentioned; some Pythagoreans believed the Earth to be one of several planets going around a central fire. Hicetas and Ecphantus, two Pythagoreans of the 5th century BC, and Heraclides Ponticus in the 4th century BC, believed that the Earth rotated on its axis but remained at the center of the universe. Such a system still qualifies as geocentric. It was revived in the Middle Ages by Jean Buridan. Heraclides Ponticus was once thought to have proposed that both Venus and Mercury went around the Sun rather than the Earth, but it is now known that he didn't. Martianus Capella definitely put Mercury and Venus in orbit around the Sun. Aristarchus of Samos wrote a work, which has not survived, on heliocentrism, saying that the Sun was at the center of the universe, while the Earth and other planets revolved around it. His theory was not popular, and he had one named follower, Seleucus of Seleucia.
Epicurus was the most radical. He correctly realized in the 4th century BC that the universe does not have any single center. This theory was widely accepted by the later Epicureans and was notably defended by Lucretius in his poem De rerum natura.

Copernican system

In 1543, the geocentric system met its first serious challenge with the publication of Copernicus' De revolutionibus orbium coelestium (On the Revolutions of the Heavenly Spheres), which posited that the Earth and the other planets instead revolved around the Sun. The geocentric system was still held for many years afterwards, as at the time the Copernican system did not offer better predictions than the geocentric system, and it posed problems for both natural philosophy and scripture. The Copernican system was no more accurate than Ptolemy's system, because it still used circular orbits. This was not altered until Johannes Kepler postulated that they were elliptical (Kepler's first law of planetary motion).

With the invention of the telescope in 1609, observations made by Galileo Galilei (such as that Jupiter has moons) called into question some of the tenets of geocentrism but did not seriously threaten it. Because he observed dark "spots" on the Moon, craters, he remarked that the moon was not a perfect celestial body as had been previously conceived. This was the first time someone could see imperfections on a celestial body that was supposed to be composed of perfect aether. As such, because the Moon's imperfections could now be related to those seen on Earth, one could argue that neither was unique: rather, they were both just celestial bodies made from Earth-like material. Galileo could also see the moons of Jupiter, which he dedicated to Cosimo II de' Medici, and stated that they orbited around Jupiter, not Earth. This was a significant claim as it would mean not only that not everything revolved around Earth as stated in the Ptolemaic model, but also showed a secondary celestial body could orbit a moving celestial body, strengthening the heliocentric argument that a moving Earth could retain the Moon. Galileo's observations were verified by other astronomers of the time period who quickly adopted use of the telescope, including Christoph Scheiner, Johannes Kepler, and Giovan Paulo Lembo.

In December 1610, Galileo Galilei used his telescope to observe that Venus showed all phases, just like the Moon. He thought that while this observation was incompatible with the Ptolemaic system, it was a natural consequence of the heliocentric system.

However, Ptolemy placed Venus' deferent and epicycle entirely inside the sphere of the Sun (between the Sun and Mercury), but this was arbitrary; he could just as easily have swapped Venus and Mercury and put them on the other side of the Sun, or made any other arrangement of Venus and Mercury, as long as they were always near a line running from the Earth through the Sun, such as placing the center of the Venus epicycle near the Sun. In this case, if the Sun is the source of all the light, under the Ptolemaic system:

But Galileo saw Venus at first small and full, and later large and crescent.

This showed that with a Ptolemaic cosmology, the Venus epicycle can be neither completely inside nor completely outside of the orbit of the Sun. As a result, Ptolemaics abandoned the idea that the epicycle of Venus was completely inside the Sun, and later 17th-century competition between astronomical cosmologies focused on variations of Tycho Brahe's Tychonic system (in which the Earth was still at the center of the universe, and around it revolved the Sun, but all other planets revolved around the Sun in one massive set of epicycles), or variations on the Copernican system.

Gravitation
Johannes Kepler analysed Tycho Brahe's famously accurate observations and afterwards constructed his three laws in 1609 and 1619, based on a heliocentric view where the planets move in elliptical paths. Using these laws, he was the first astronomer to successfully predict a transit of Venus for the year 1631. The change from circular orbits to elliptical planetary paths dramatically improved the accuracy of celestial observations and predictions. Because the heliocentric model devised by Copernicus was no more accurate than Ptolemy's system, new observations were needed to persuade those who still adhered to the geocentric model. However, Kepler's laws based on Brahe's data became a problem which geocentrists could not easily overcome.

In 1687, Isaac Newton stated the law of universal gravitation, described earlier as a hypothesis by Robert Hooke and others. His main achievement was to mathematically derive Kepler's laws of planetary motion from the law of gravitation, thus helping to prove the latter. This introduced gravitation as the force which both kept the Earth and planets moving through the universe and also kept the atmosphere from flying away. The theory of gravity allowed scientists to rapidly construct a plausible heliocentric model for the Solar System. In his Principia, Newton explained his theory of how gravity, previously thought to be a mysterious, unexplained occult force, directed the movements of celestial bodies, and kept our Solar System in working order. His descriptions of centripetal force were a breakthrough in scientific thought, using the newly developed mathematical discipline of differential calculus, finally replacing the previous schools of scientific thought, which had been dominated by Aristotle and Ptolemy. However, the process was gradual.

Several empirical tests of Newton's theory, explaining the longer period of oscillation of a pendulum at the equator and the differing size of a degree of latitude, would gradually become available between 1673 and 1738. In addition, stellar aberration was observed by Robert Hooke in 1674, and tested in a series of observations by Jean Picard over a period of ten years, finishing in 1680. However, it was not explained until 1729, when James Bradley provided an approximate explanation in terms of the Earth's revolution about the Sun.

In 1838, astronomer Friedrich Wilhelm Bessel measured the parallax of the star 61 Cygni successfully, and disproved Ptolemy's claim that parallax motion did not exist. This finally confirmed the assumptions made by Copernicus, providing accurate, dependable scientific observations, and conclusively displaying how distant stars are from Earth.

A geocentric frame is useful for many everyday activities and most laboratory experiments, but is a less appropriate choice for Solar System mechanics and space travel. While a heliocentric frame is most useful in those cases, galactic and extragalactic astronomy is easier if the Sun is treated as neither stationary nor the center of the universe, but rather rotating around the center of our galaxy, while in turn our galaxy is also not at rest in the cosmic background.

Relativity
Albert Einstein and Leopold Infeld wrote in The Evolution of Physics (1938): "Can we formulate physical laws so that they are valid for all CS (=coordinate systems), not only those moving uniformly, but also those moving quite arbitrarily, relative to each other? If this can be done, our difficulties will be over. We shall then be able to apply the laws of nature to any CS. The struggle, so violent in the early days of science, between the views of Ptolemy and Copernicus would then be quite meaningless. Either CS could be used with equal justification. The two sentences, 'the sun is at rest and the Earth moves', or 'the sun moves and the Earth is at rest', would simply mean two different conventions concerning two different CS.
Could we build a real relativistic physics valid in all CS; a physics in which there would be no place for absolute, but only for relative, motion? This is indeed possible!"

Despite giving more respectability to the geocentric view than Newtonian physics does, relativity is not geocentric. Rather, relativity states that the Sun, the Earth, the Moon, Jupiter, or any other point for that matter could be chosen as a center of the Solar System with equal validity.

Relativity agrees with Newtonian predictions that regardless of whether the Sun or the Earth are chosen arbitrarily as the center of the coordinate system describing the Solar System, the paths of the planets form (roughly) ellipses with respect to the Sun, not the Earth. With respect to the average reference frame of the fixed stars, the planets do indeed move around the Sun, which due to its much larger mass, moves far less than its own diameter and the gravity of which is dominant in determining the orbits of the planets (in other words, the center of mass of the Solar System is near the center of the Sun).

What the principle of relativity points out is that correct mathematical calculations can be made regardless of the reference frame chosen, and these will all agree with each other as to the predictions of actual motions of bodies with respect to each other. It is not necessary to choose the object in the Solar System with the largest gravitational field as the center of the coordinate system in order to predict the motions of planetary bodies, though doing so may make calculations easier to perform or interpret. A geocentric coordinate system can be more convenient when dealing only with bodies mostly influenced by the gravity of the Earth (such as artificial satellites and the Moon), or when calculating what the sky will look like when viewed from Earth (as opposed to an imaginary observer looking down on the entire Solar System, where a different coordinate system might be more convenient).

Religious and contemporary adherence to geocentrism
The Ptolemaic model of the solar system held sway into the early modern age; from the late 16th century onward it was gradually replaced as the consensus description by the heliocentric model. Geocentrism as a separate religious belief, however, never completely died out. In the United States between 1870 and 1920, for example, various members of the Lutheran Church–Missouri Synod published articles disparaging Copernican astronomy and promoting geocentrism. However, in the 1902 Theological Quarterly, A. L. Graebner observed that the synod had no doctrinal position on geocentrism, heliocentrism, or any scientific model, unless it were to contradict Scripture. He stated that any possible declarations of geocentrists within the synod did not set the position of the church body as a whole.

Articles arguing that geocentrism was the biblical perspective appeared in some early creation science newsletters pointing to some passages in the Bible, which, when taken literally, indicate that the daily apparent motions of the Sun and the Moon are due to their actual motions around the Earth rather than due to the rotation of the Earth about its axis. Contemporary advocates for such religious beliefs include Robert Sungenis (author of the 2006 book Galileo Was Wrong and the 2014 pseudo-documentary film The Principle). These people subscribe to the view that a plain reading of the Bible contains an accurate account of the manner in which the universe was created and requires a geocentric worldview. Most contemporary creationist organizations reject such perspectives.

Polls
According to a report released in 2014 by the National Science Foundation, 26% of Americans surveyed believe that the sun revolves around the Earth.
Morris Berman quotes a 2006 survey that show currently some 20% of the U.S. population believe that the Sun goes around the Earth (geocentricism) rather than the Earth goes around the Sun (heliocentricism), while a further 9% claimed not to know. Polls conducted by Gallup in the 1990s found that 16% of Germans, 18% of Americans and 19% of Britons hold that the Sun revolves around the Earth. A study conducted in 2005 by Jon D. Miller of Northwestern University, an expert in the public understanding of science and technology, found that about 20%, or one in five, of American adults believe that the Sun orbits the Earth. According to 2011 VTSIOM poll, 32% of Russians believe that the Sun orbits the Earth.

Historical positions of the Roman Catholic hierarchy
The famous Galileo affair pitted the geocentric model against the claims of Galileo. In regards to the theological basis for such an argument, two Popes addressed the question of whether the use of phenomenological language would compel one to admit an error in Scripture. Both taught that it would not. Pope Leo XIII (1878–1903) wrote:

Maurice Finocchiaro, author of a book on the Galileo affair, notes that this is "a view of the relationship between biblical interpretation and scientific investigation that corresponds to the one advanced by Galileo in the "Letter to the Grand Duchess Christina". Pope Pius XII (1939–1958) repeated his predecessor's teaching:

In 1664, Pope Alexander VII republished the Index Librorum Prohibitorum (List of Prohibited Books) and attached the various decrees connected with those books, including those concerned with heliocentrism. He stated in a Papal Bull that his purpose in doing so was that "the succession of things done from the beginning might be made known [quo rei ab initio gestae series innotescat]".

The position of the curia evolved slowly over the centuries towards permitting the heliocentric view. In 1757, during the papacy of Benedict XIV, the Congregation of the Index withdrew the decree which prohibited all books teaching the Earth's motion, although the Dialogue and a few other books continued to be explicitly included. In 1820, the Congregation of the Holy Office, with the pope's approval, decreed that Catholic astronomer Giuseppe Settele was allowed to treat the Earth's motion as an established fact and removed any obstacle for Catholics to hold to the motion of the Earth:

In 1822, the Congregation of the Holy Office removed the prohibition on the publication of books treating of the Earth's motion in accordance with modern astronomy and Pope Pius VII ratified the decision:

The 1835 edition of the Catholic List of Prohibited Books for the first time omits the Dialogue from the list. In his 1921 papal encyclical, In praeclara summorum, Pope Benedict XV stated that, "though this Earth on which we live may not be the center of the universe as at one time was thought, it was the scene of the original happiness of our first ancestors, witness of their unhappy fall, as too of the Redemption of mankind through the Passion and Death of Jesus Christ". In 1965 the Second Vatican Council stated that, "Consequently, we cannot but deplore certain habits of mind, which are sometimes found too among Christians, which do not sufficiently attend to the rightful independence of science and which, from the arguments and controversies they spark, lead many minds to conclude that faith and science are mutually opposed." The footnote on this statement is to Msgr. Pio Paschini's, Vita e opere di Galileo Galilei, 2 volumes, Vatican Press (1964). Pope John Paul II regretted the treatment which Galileo received, in a speech to the Pontifical Academy of Sciences in 1992. The Pope declared the incident to be based on a "tragic mutual miscomprehension". He further stated:

Orthodox Judaism

A few Orthodox Jewish leaders maintain a geocentric model of the universe based on the aforementioned Biblical verses and an interpretation of Maimonides to the effect that he ruled that the Earth is orbited by the Sun. The Lubavitcher Rebbe also explained that geocentrism is defensible based on the theory of relativity, which establishes that "when two bodies in space are in motion relative to one another, ... science declares with absolute certainty that from the scientific point of view both possibilities are equally valid, namely that the Earth revolves around the sun, or the sun revolves around the Earth", although he also went on to refer to people who believed in geocentrism as "remaining in the world of Copernicus".

The Zohar states: "The entire world and those upon it, spin round in a circle like a ball, both those at the bottom of the ball and those at the top. All God's creatures, wherever they live on the different parts of the ball, look different (in color, in their features) because the air is different in each place, but they stand erect as all other human beings, therefore, there are places in the world where, when some have light, others have darkness; when some have day, others have night."

While geocentrism is important in Maimonides' calendar calculations, the great majority of Jewish religious scholars, who accept the divinity of the Bible and accept many of his rulings as legally binding, do not believe that the Bible or Maimonides command a belief in geocentrism.

Islam

After the translation movement led by the Mu'tazila, which included the translation of Almagest from Latin to Arabic, Muslims adopted and refined the geocentric model of Ptolemy, which they believed correlated with the teachings of Islam.

Prominent cases of modern geocentrism are very isolated. Very few individuals promoted a geocentric view of the universe. One of them was Ahmed Raza Khan Barelvi, a Sunni scholar of the Indian subcontinent. He rejected the heliocentric model and wrote a book that explains the movement of the sun, moon and other planets around the Earth.

Planetariums
The geocentric (Ptolemaic) model of the Solar System is a critical mathematical system for the design of geared planetary orbital projection within electro-optical planetarium projectors. 

The movement of the planets across the projected sky require the use of circular gears and linear guiding rods for the projectors, and the Ptolemaic system permits the mechanical engineering design of these components to then project the position of the planets with sufficient accuracy to allow the resulting instruments projection to hold value in teaching celestial navigation, among other applications in observational astronomy. 

In turn, the projection of the celestial sphere, still used for teaching purposes and sometimes for navigation, is also based on a geocentric system which in effect ignores parallax. However this effect is negligible at the scale of accuracy that applies to an electro-mechanical planetarium.

In the era of the digital planetarium, the Ptolemaic system retains value in offering a computationally less intensive means to forecast the projection of the planets, in which the Keplerian model acts as a numerical correction to the Ptolemaic system, rather than replacing it fully in projectors of this type.

See also
 Aristotelian physics
 Earth-centered, Earth-fixed coordinate system
 History of the center of the Universe
 
 Religious cosmology
 Sphere of fire
 Wolfgang Smith, Catholic mathematician

Notes

References

Bibliography
 
 
 
 
 
 
  1990 reprint: .
 
 
 
  Google Books

External links

Another demonstration of the complexity of observed orbits when assuming a geocentric model of the Solar System
Geocentric Perspective animation of the Solar System in 150AD
Ptolemy’s system of astronomy 
The Galileo Project – Ptolemaic System

Ancient Greek astronomy
Astronomical coordinate systems
Scientific models
Early scientific cosmologies
Copernican Revolution